Fairview, Burlington County, New Jersey may refer to:

Fairview, Delran, New Jersey
Fairview, Medford, New Jersey